The ClanDestine (also known simply as ClanDestine) is an appellation used to refer to the Destines, a fictional secret family of long-lived superhuman beings appearing in American comic books published by Marvel Comics. They were created in 1994 by British writer/artist Alan Davis, and appear in various comic book series published by Marvel Comics. They first appeared in Marvel Comics Presents #158 (July 1994) before going on to appear in their own self-titled monthly series, The ClanDestine, which lasted twelve issues before it was cancelled. The characters subsequently appeared in a number of miniseries and one-shots, all written and drawn by Davis. The name ClanDestine, which is a play on the word clandestine, is used primarily as the title of the series in which the family stars, and is not generally used by the characters within the stories.

A version of the ClanDestine, known as Clandestines, appeared as antagonists of the Marvel Cinematic Universe Disney+ series Ms. Marvel (2022).

Publication history
Creator Alan Davis explained that he likes the superhero genre in general, and the group book dynamic in particular, and was drawn to the opportunity to create a group of new characters unencumbered by a long and complex continuity, though he set it in the Marvel Universe in order to use characters like the Silver Surfer and MODOK in cameo roles.  Since the range of superhuman abilities is limited, and good gimmicks rare and short-lived, Davis observed that the greatest opportunity for originality is in character development and interaction.  Davis chose to make the group a family because the familial bond is not one of choice, and can be either rewarding or painful. Davis was also interested in superhumans who used their powers to enhance their lives, but did not necessarily feel either any heroic obligations or megalomaniacal greed. Although he made the Destines an extended family in order to make up new family members as he went along, the core of the group would be Rory, Pandora, Samantha, Walter, Kay and Dominic. Although the family's full membership remains unrevealed for this reason, Walter has stated that there are "many" that eleven-year-old twins Rory and Pandora have not met.

After the end of the original series, Davis wrote and drew the 1996 miniseries X-Men and the ClanDestine, during which the events of the last four issues of the ongoing series (the only stories he had not written and drawn) were retconned by Davis as a dream. In 2008, he returned to the characters in a five-issue limited series. In 2012, he wrote and drew three linked annuals: Fantastic Four Annual #33, Daredevil Annual #1, and Wolverine Annual #1, each of which centered upon a different member of the Destine family interacting with the other heroes of the Marvel Universe.

Fictional history
Adam of Ravenscroft was born in the village of Ravenscroft in the heart of England in the summer of 1168 A.D., when Saxon England was ruled by Norman conquerors.  Adam's youth was unremarkable, and he grew content without ambition.  When he was sixteen, however, he was accidentally impaled on a scythe, but he miraculously recovered after a dream about a strange, inhuman woman. He was renamed Adam of Destine by the town, who felt the young man was destined for greatness. In 1189, Adam joined the Third Crusade. During the battles, Adam was never once injured and he believed that the "angel" he dreamt about protected him. By 1191 he was a seasoned veteran of battles at Acre, Arsuf and Jaffa. He became overconfident and reckless, and was captured by a warlord called Al Kadhdhaab. Kadhdhaab claimed that he needed Adam's help to defeat the wizard Sujanaa Min Raghbah. Centuries prior, Sujanaa captured a large gem with mystical powers that fulfilled his wishes. In a vision Sujanaa had seen that Adam was destined to kill him, and Kadhdhaab also knows this through a written prophecy. Adam traveled to Sujanaa's palace, but was captured by him. The wizard ranted that his gem loved Adam, and would not allow Sujanaa to hurt him. Adam managed to distract the wizard by telling him that Sujanaa had wasted his life, using all his power merely to protect his power. The wizard realized that he had become trapped by his own desire for power and during a moment of doubt, Adam was freed and killed the wizard. Adam then felt that there was something alive within the gem and tried to destroy its prison, but Kadhdhaab appeared and shot him in the back with a crossbow. Kadhdhaab tried to take the power of the gem for himself, but Adam managed to destroy the gem with his last strength. Elalyth, the female being within, called a Djinn, appeared and destroyed Kadhdhaab. She then restored Adam, making him immortal and invulnerable, and the two became lovers.

Relative strangers

Over the next few centuries Adam and Elalyth had many children, all of whom inherited superhuman abilities and were extremely long-lived. As civilization advanced, and the advent of modern technology made it more difficult for members of the family to disappear or pass themselves off as their own descendants, one of Adam's children, Newton, set up the Relative Stranger Protocol. The protocol would create new identities for the long-lived family members whenever they required it and would protect the family should one of them be uncovered. In the late 20th century, after Adam's son Vincent destroyed the family manor, Adam killed him, because Adam felt he had become "evil". The family fell apart after that. Dominic, who saw Adam's actions as unforgivable, became a hermit, living in solitude on a small island. Elalyth returned to her mystical home of Yden, and Adam, who saw his slaying of Vincent as a betrayal of her love, left Earth, traveling through outer space in a vehicle created by Newton. The newly born twins, Rory and Pandora, were left with Walter Destine, who posed as their uncle and guardian, and Florence, who posed as their grandmother.

Imp and the Crimson Crusader
Rory and Pandora's powers activated far earlier than those of their siblings, because they were twins.a The children, believing they were mutants, decided to become superheroes. As the Crimson Crusader and Imp, they set out to battle crime. One evening they found two groups, creature Lenz and his "children", and Dr. Hywel Griffin and his Omegans, fighting each other over a device called the Gryphon. Not knowing which side to help, the children grabbed the device and left the scene, intending to return it once they found out who the rightful owner was.

"Gryphon" turned out to be an acronym for the device, its full name being Genetic Realignment Yield Polarity Harmonizing Orientation Net, having the ability to genetically remodel a fully developed organism, irrespective of age or genetic composition.
Lenz, a former human scientist mutated into a monstrous new form by Advanced Idea Mechanics (A.I.M.), hoped to use the Gryphon to stabilize his "children", who usually died within several days. Griffin was an albino who hoped to cure himself with the Gryphon. Both parties tried to track down the Destine twins. During the twins' attempt to flee, Pandora had lost her cape, which had the name of their sister, Kay Cera, in it, who had designed it. Lenz sent his children out to kill Kay and they found the history of the ClanDestine in Kay's notebook. Kay herself survived by transferring her mind to a cat. Lenz creatures attacked the various members of the ClanDestine, killing Florence and Maurice. Most of the other family members united and tracked down Griffin, whom they thought responsible for the deaths of Flo and Maurice. Lenz appeared and kidnapped Rory, but they were all saved by Adam, who had felt the death of his children and returned to Earth. Adam defeated Lenz, but let him go when he realized that Lenz was not evil, just trying to let his species survive.

When the Destines return home, Adam agrees to respect Walter's status as the twins' guardian, as Adam felt he relinquished that right when left Earth in grief eleven years previously. Walter wants the children to return to school and live normal lives, even threatening to split them up after they get into trouble at school. The children flee to New York to become full-time superheroes, but Spider-Man convinces them to return home. Dominic and Adam convinced Walter to allow the twins to go out at night on "crime patrol" confronting only petty crime, with the adults taking turns chaperoning them.

Dream sequence
Series creator Alan Davis left the series after issue #8. The series continued for four more issues under the creative team of writer Glenn Dakin and artists Pino Rinaldi and Bryan Hitch. In these four issues, Adam tries to return the Gryphon to Griffen, and Lenz, now allied with MODAM, tries to steal it again. MODAM is more interested in the Destine family, however, and kidnaps Cuckoo, leaving a girl named Myror in her place. Myror has the ability to reflect to people what they wanted to see. Wanting Cuckoo to return home with them, the Clan saw Myror as Cuckoo. Myror eventually tells the Destines that she wanted to help them defeat MODAM, who had used her as a slave for years. Back in the A.I.M. base, MODAM tries to switch minds with Cuckoo in order to acquire a beautiful, human body for herself. Meanwhile, Rory is manipulated by the spirit of Vincent into resurrecting him. While Vincent's only appearance to date was in a 1963 photo of him seen in issue #2 that showed him as a man with a normal build and brown hair in a style common to the 1960s, in this incarnation he appeared as a heavily muscled man with long blonde hair. Vincent joins Rory and Pandora into saving the Clan from MODAM, and A.I.M. Vincent uses his powers to torment all non-Destine family members with personal demons, including William and Myrror. Vincent then tells the others that with Adam's absence, he now has to take over the leadership of the family.

X-Men and The ClanDestine
This two-part series featured the first appearance of family member Gracie, who had been mentioned before. Years previously, Gracie and Cuckoo had banished a demon called Synraith from Earth many years ago with the help of a younger and less experienced Charles Xavier. In the miniseries, the Synraith returns and tries eliminate the three who stopped him. The X-Men and the Destines team up to stop the demon and save their family members.

ClanDestine Volume 2

A five-issue ClanDestine miniseries debuted on February 5, 2008, written and illustrated by Alan Davis. In this series, Dr. Griffin and the Omegans again attack the Destines. In the course of the story, what happened to Thaddeus in 1374 is revealed. Newton builds a device to help Dominic ameliorate the effects of his powerful senses. Dominic also travels through time and space, and encounters the superhero group Excalibur, in the middle of the "Cross-Time Caper" storyline that ran in their self-titled series in 1989–1990. The story also guest stars the Inhumans. Walter struggles with his fears of becoming like Vincent. By the end of the story, Adam reduces Griffin to an infant, and tells the Omegans never to threaten his family again, before being reunited with Elalyth, the mother of his children, with whom he goes to live in Yden. Dominic decides to relocate to the idyllic Etherea. In the closing panels of the story, a pool of energy emerges from the grounds of the Ravenscroft, and flies into Vincent's grave, causing the gravestone to crack.

Marvel Tales by Alan Davis
In mid-2012 Alan Davis wrote and illustrated a trio of annuals under the brand "Marvel Tales by Alan Davis", which featured the ClanDestine as guest stars, including Vincent, in his first canonical appearances: Fantastic Four Annual #33, Daredevil Annual #1 and Wolverine Annual (vol 2) #1.

In Fantastic Four Annual #33, which reveals the circumstances under which Adam killed Vincent, the American superhero adventurers Thing, Human Torch and Doctor Strange encounter an interdimensional rift whose energy hurls them on a journey through time and space, during which they come into contact with the Destine family at various points in history. Thing in particular encounters Vincent as a young boy, then as a young man, and is present at his death. Vincent is tortured by his inability to use his powers to stop the pain and suffering in the world, and is revealed to have been possessed by demons who are trying to delay Doctor Strange in healing the dimensional rift. Fearing the destruction Vincent's powers are unleashing and for his son's soul, Adam fatally snaps Vincent's neck. The dimensional energy is driven away, and the Americans are returned home.

In Daredevil Annual #1, the Destines travel to New York tracking a robot called the Plastoid. Cuckoo believes that it is inhabited by a parasitic elemental, whom she intends to banish back to its native dimension. Dominic and the rest of the Destines, however, believe the robot is in fact inhabited by Vincent's spirit, and aim to stop Cuckoo from destroying it. During this conflict they also encounter Daredevil and Doctor Strange, who assist the family. Daredevil destroys the Plastoid, releasing Vincent's spirit.

The storyline concludes in Wolverine Annual (vol 2) #1, which includes a flashback depicting a prior adventure that Adam shared with Wolverine. In the present, Vincent animates a group of ancient Heliopolitan gods (hybrids of Egyptian deities and humans that resemble humanoids with animal heads), which battle Wolverine, Dr. Strange, and the Destine family, including Cuckoo, who confirms telepathically that the being they are pursuing is indeed Vincent. Vincent explains that he arranged a number of events, including Adam and Elalyth's recent reunion, in order to bring about his own resurrection, and ultimately intends to use Wolverine's superhuman form as a vessel to contain his power. His plan is foiled by Cuckoo, Rory, Pandora, and Wolverine, who destroy Vincent.

Cast

Living members
Although there is a core group of family members, Alan Davis has stated there are an unknown number of other family members who usually keep to themselves. For this reason, the following family members are listed here in approximate order of age, based on the family tree given in the 2008 The ClanDestine miniseries, and other sources. Rik Destine, whose birth order is unknown, is placed before Rory and Pandora Destine, because the latter are known to be the youngest members of the family. All of the Destines, especially Adam, have a mental link to their family, allowing them to sometimes feel when other family members are in danger.

Adam Destine – Adam was born Adam of Ravenscroft in 1168. While fighting in the Third Crusade, he rescued a Djinn named Elalyth that he first saw in a vision when he was sixteen. She made him immortal and invulnerable, and bore him numerous children. In 1374, Adam and his son Thaddeus were escorting his other son Albert to the Shalu Monastery in Shigatse, Tibet, when they were attacked by the Geong Si, an army of zombies controlled by the Inhuman Tral. During the battle, Thaddeus was knocked off a cliff, and the otherwise pacifistic Albert, in his grief, lashed out at their attackers, discovering that his healing ability could be manifested as a weapon, and killed them all, much to his subsequent regret. Other Inhumans then appeared, explaining that Tral was a criminal who escaped their hidden city. Adam traveled to Russia in 1612 to help establish the Romanov Dynasty. While horseback riding through the Sayan Mountains in 1615 en route to Japan to aid Albert and Grace, he encountered a trio of armored insectoid extraterrestrials attempting to construct a teleportational portal through which to bring an army to claim the Earth. The aliens attacked Adam, but none of their weapons could harm him, and believing that his invulnerability was representative of the entire human race, they departed, fearing they could not conquer Earth. In the 1950s, he consulted Albert Einstein for help explaining Vincent's behavior, as Adam did not initially believe Vincent's claim that he could travel through time.

Adam is immune to any injury, and cannot be harmed by any weapon or attack, including psychic attack. Attempts by his daughter Kay to read his mind, in fact, result in pain for her, because of the "clairvoyant insight" he has developed due to his advanced age. He almost never feels pain, with two exceptions: When he senses when one of his children has died or is led to believe by his precognitive abilities that one of his children's death is imminent, and when Vincent, under the possession of an interdimensional demon, attacked him with mystical energy. He does not require nourishment, can survive in the vacuum of outer space, and does not need to sleep. While he is visible in the portion of the electromagnetic spectrum perceivable to humans, he is invisible to scans using higher wavelengths. Because Adam's abilities are magical in origin, he appears to the Silver Surfer's cosmic senses to be human, without any biological or mechanical enhancements that the Surfer can perceive. He even lacks a scent that can be detected by the X-Man Wolverine, whom he met at some point in his travels. Having watched his children grow old and die, he came to see his long existence as a curse, and finds that because of his invulnerability, his senses are numbed, and he does not feel pleasure any more than he feels pain. In the first ClanDestine storyline, Adam even asks the Silver Surfer if he knows how he can die. Dominic has observed that Adam no longer exhibits the basic responses of survival instinct, such as scanning his surroundings or flinching in anticipation of danger, never twitching nor fidgeting because he never tires. Adam concedes that this gives only a vague awareness of what he touches.  Dominic feels that what is worse is Adam's emotional detachment, his lack of expression, and aloofness, as if he is bored with human existence, and feels Adam is not applying the great intellect he accumulated over eight centuries to himself. Adam initially feels that Elalyth never forgave him for killing Vincent, but Albert does not believe this, pointing out that he still has her protection of immortality, though Adam fears that this is so that he could live a life tortured by guilt. He is reunited with Elalyth, who is very much happy to see him, in ClanDestine (Vol. 2) #5.

Elalyth – a green-skinned being called a Djinn, similar to a genie, that met Adam in the 12th century, after she first appeared to him in a dream. She gave him the gift of immortality. After Adam killed Vincent, she left him, and returned to the mystical realm of Yden. Aside from flashbacks, Elalyth did not appear, nor was her name revealed, until ClanDestine (Vol. 2) #5, in which she is reunited with Adam, who goes to live with her in Yden. A sketch of Adam and the core Destine characters on the first page of the sketchbook section in the 1994 ClanDestine Preview issue bears the caption, "She left and he got custody of the kids".

Jasmine Destine, also known as Kay Cera and as Cuckoo – the first born of Adam and Elalyth's children, Jasmine is an 800-year-old telepath who has the ability to transfer her consciousness to mortally wounded host bodies when the one she inhabits is destroyed, and having her brother Albert heal the body's injuries, for which she is known as Cuckoo. In 1519 she was in the newly discovered Mexico, exploring the territory with Hernán Cortés's conquistadores while inhabiting the body of a Spanish nobleman, with her sister Grace posing as her valet. At this point Cuckoo had begun to study magic, and learned to channel eldritch forces to enhance her powers. When the conquistadores attacked the Aztecs, Grace, whose emerging psychic gifts were too immature to use as weapons, fled with Cuckoo and some of the Aztecs that they had befriended, but the two were separated. In 1526 she was in Peru, and at some point during or prior to this, learned a Mayan dialect. In the 1860s, she inhabited the body of Natsume Masako, the wife of Prince Sakai Masaaki. During this time, she was attacked by the vampire Marietta Borgezia, and reacted by killing Borgezia's spirit with her own consciousness, which resulted in the vampire becoming Jasmine's new host. As all the vampyr created by Borgezia were freed of their bloodthirst with her death, they gratefully came to regard Jasmine as family, even as she would later move onto other host bodies. Her next known incarnation was among her most recent, when she inhabited the body of a Native American woman, and helped Grace and a young Professor Xavier battle a demon called the Synraith. In recent years she has lived as fashion designer Kay Cera, creator of the Kay Cera label. She owns homes in Geneva, New York City, Los Angeles, Tokyo, and Rio de Janeiro. When Adam killed Vincent, she was in her forty-third host body. She has switched bodies three times during Dominic's lifetime, and Samantha was a child when she acquired the last one prior to her current body, which formerly belonged to Barcelona prostitute Pepa Perez. When healing this current body, Albert, appalled at the questionable ethics of Cuckoo's use of others' bodies, informed her that this would be the last time he would do this.

Cuckoo can read the minds of others, project telepathic illusions, project her astral body, bring the astral bodies of other people to her location, and when mortally wounded, transfer her mind to the bodies of other humans and even animals in order to prolong her life. She can also put someone into a coma in order to protect them from psychic attack, or use that person as a conduit through which she can psychically attack someone else.  She is unable to read the minds of Lenz's creatures (though she was able to sense enough of their minds to be frightened of them), nor is she any match for Lenz himself. She is also unable to read her father's mind, as it causes her great pain, and is not as powerful a telepath as Charles Xavier, who easily repelled her unwanted telepathic advances. Jasmine can also project telekinetic blasts. She noticed that she lost a degree of control since transferring to her current host. Her psychic powers always experience "glitches" when she settles into a new host body, especially when the death of the previous one is particularly violent.

She is a hedonist, and will use her powers for her own benefit, casually reading or manipulating the minds of others without their permission, out of curiosity, personal gain or anger, much to the disapproval of others. Walter does not approve of how she indulges the twins' superhero fantasies, or how she visits only when her lifestyle permits it, buying the twins' affections with gifts. Unlike Dominic, Kay supports Adam's killing of Vincent, saying that he was a "bad seed".

Alan Davis designed her out of his love of drawing "impossibly beautiful" women. He originally called her Mosaic (describing her fractured psyche), but DC had just published a book with "Mosaic" in the title, so her codename was to be Kimera, but Namorita's name was changed to Kymera just before the series was published, forcing Davis to again change her name. He describes her as "Confident. Non-conformist. Practical but stylish." Cuckoo's current body is sometimes depicted as a Caucasian, and other times with brown skin of varying darkness.

Albert Destine – a monk in the Seventh Moon temple in Nepal, who has the ability to heal others. Albert suffered terribly when he attempted to use his powers to stem the Black Death that had swept through Europe, though the details of this part of his life have not been specified.  In the winter of 1374, he was being escorted to the Shalu Monastery in Shigatse, Tibet by Adam and his brother Thaddeus, and when Thaddeus was knocked over a cliff by an army of zombies led by the Inhuman Tral, the normally pacifistic Albert lashed out, discovering his healing ability could be used as a weapon, and killed Tral, much to his subsequent regret. In 1615 Albert and Grace were in Japan protecting the Shogun Tokugawa during a coup. On many occasions he has healed a mortally wounded human body that Cuckoo acquired as a host. After healing the fatal stab wounds incurred by her current host, he informed her that this would be the very last time he would do so, vowing that when she lost this host, she would die. Like Kay, Gracie and Nathaniel, he is a practitioner of the mystic arts, but has never been adept as they in using them. Among his mystical abilities is the ability to teleport people across large distances. The range of this power is unknown, but he once transported his father from the United Kingdom to Nepal, and then from Nepal to Iran.

Grace "Gracie" Destine – born in 1503, Grace is an archeologist with strong telepathic and telekinetic powers. In 1519, when she and Cuckoo (inhabiting the body of a Spanish nobleman) were in the newly discovered Mexico, exploring the territory with Hernán Cortés's conquistadores, sixteen-year-old Grace, who easily passed for a boy, posed as his valet. When the conquistadores attacked the Aztecs, Grace, whose emerging psychic gifts were too immature to use as weapons, left with Cuckoo and some of the Aztecs that they had befriended, but the two were separated. Grace followed Cuckoo's example, and learned to channel eldritch forces to enhance her powers. In doing this, she accidentally unleashed a demon called the Synraith. She managed to seal the dimensional rift from which it came, but as it now knew where our dimension was, it would eventually return. In 1615 Grace and Albert were in Japan protecting the Shogun Tokugawa during a coup. At some point in her travels she became acquainted with the young sorcerer who in his old age would become known as the Ancient One, the mentor to Doctor Strange, and Strange's predecessor as Sorcerer Supreme of Earth. She later fought the Synraith a second time centuries later with Cuckoo (now in the body of a Native American woman) and a young Charles Xavier. They finally managed to destroy the creature during their third encounter with it, with the help of Adam and the X-Men, during the 1996 ClanDestine and X-Men miniseries.

Newton Destine – a superhuman genius whose talents include mechanical engineering, chemistry, medicine and surgery.  He built the ClanDestine's advanced technology and set up the Relative Strangers Protocol. He vanished to Etherea, an alternate Earth in another dimension, during Rory and Pandora's infancy, but teleports back to Earth whenever Dominic calls him, using a special signal watch. While Warlord of the planet Ethera, he had another body engineered on Narcissus 4, one that is taller and far more muscular, and therefore more suited to the lifestyle of a leader, and when using this body, he keeps his original body in suspended animation, as he prefers that more meek body for intellectual pursuits. In addition to teleportational devices, he has also built sophisticated powered armor suits and weapons. Newton wears a device called a "psi-shield" to prevent Kay from probing his mind. Time moves faster on Etherea than on Earth.  Three Etherean days are equivalent to nine Earth hours, which often allows Newton to respond to the signal watch and build devices apparently quickly. Despite his genius, he is not a theoretician, as his science is practical and instinctive.

Walter "Wallop" Destine – Walter is a writer of romance novels under the pseudonym Sabrina Bentley, who has the ability to transform into a large, hulking blue creature with immense strength and invulnerability. He usually maintains his personality and intelligence in this state, but when pushing his ability to transform larger and larger, his hair becomes aflame, and he is prone to losing his temper, and going berserk. He can also inadvertently transform if he loses his temper or if it is triggered by psychic attack. Transforming back to human form takes a long time, and is often not complete, as sometimes his ears or feet will remain in their monstrous state.

Walter is at least 200 years old, and has experienced conflict in numerous wars. He was in Shanghai during the Opium War, in Balaclava during the Crimean War, in Delhi during the Sepoy Mutiny, in Passchendaele during World War I, and in El Alamein during World War II, during which he served with military intelligence. In 1944 his station was attacked by the Nazis with a large robotic war machine. The war machine was confronted by the Invaders (Captain America, the Submariner and the Human Torch), but rendered them unconscious. Walter then transformed and destroyed the robot before fleeing from Allied soldiers, who happened on the scene and thought him in league with the Nazis. As part of the Relative Stranger Protocol, he is known today to outsiders as the son of the Walter Destine who served in WWII. He is the guardian of Rory and Pandora, who were led to believe for years that he was their uncle.  They gave him the codename Wallop, though he refuses to accept this name. As the twins' primary guardian, he is generally strict, and resents the appearance of the other siblings in the children's lives when it suits them, especially Kay, who he feels tries to buy the twins' affections with gifts when her hedonistic lifestyle allows. Alan Davis tried to design a costume for Wallop, but felt they all looked silly in some of his more extreme incarnations.

William "Oz" Chance – an actor who plays the role of Cap'n Oz in action movies. He has peak human strength and acrobatic agility. He first appeared in The ClanDestine (Vol. 1) #2. He was present at the 1969 Woodstock festival with Dominic and the adolescent Vincent.

Dominic "Hex" Destine – as a child, Dominic, who has bright red hair and pale green skin, felt neglected by Adam, whom he saw as aloof. After developing his super senses in adulthood, he became an illusionist and escapologist named Hex. His costume is the one he used as a performer. Prior to Vincent's death, during one performance in New York City's Greenwich Village, an encounter with a Chinese puzzle box caused him to fall into an occult dimensional realm, from which he was rescued by Doctor Strange. After Adam killed Vincent, and because Walter allowed him to, Dominic, who harbored resentment towards them, retreated to a remote island for eleven years, in part because his enhanced senses are overwhelmed in more urban areas. Although Dominic moved to the Destine family estate following Adam's return to Earth, he refused a reconciliation with Adam, saying that he would never forgive him for killing Vincent. He went to live on Etherea with Newton at the end of ClanDestine (Vol. 2) #5.

Walter describes Dominic as quite brilliant, with a capacity for flawless deductive reasoning. This, and his enhanced senses, make him the ultimate sleuth. He is an expert hand-to-hand fighter with a slim, athletic build, and his knowledge of pressure points and nerve clusters makes him one of the few people who can hurt or subdue Walter in his transformed state. His sense of hearing allows him to hear through concrete and steel walls. His sense of smell is so acute that he can detect the scent of someone who has handled an object that he examines. He can also identify the specific food ingredients that someone has handled, even after they have washed their hands, and can smell the traces of other people that person has been near. When scouting the Griffin Technologies Complex from a nearby hill, he was able to ascertain that the complex included a large underground structure three levels deeps, which housed large amounts of machinery, but no life forms, though it was not specified which senses he utilized to discern this. His sense of taste is so acute that in one scene, a small bite of chocolate intoxicates him into unconsciousness, in part because of eleven years of having eaten only seafood at the time. His eyesight allows him to see wavelengths of the EM spectrum outside the normal human range. He can also perceive the aura surrounding Samantha that she can tap into to utilize her armor. His senses can be occluded if they are overloaded by infra-red, microwave and sonic emissions from hi-tech security systems, and being scanned by high-frequency wavelengths can cause him great pain. The sensitivity created by his heightened senses make him easily incapacitated by relatively modest blows to his body, which despite his otherwise considerable fighting skills, create a substantial weakness for him in close quarters combat. When living at the Destine estate, he usually spends his time in an anechoic chamber that his brother Newton built below the manor, which remains after the manor was destroyed. Newton also built an isolation shell generator for Dominic to wear on his wrist, which creates anti-stimulation aura, as a sort of portable anechoic chamber. Alan Davis describes him as "Aggressive. Volatile. A hunter". His original design was that of an animalistic wild man with a costume with animal skin patterns. In his sketchbook, he called the character "Vex", rather than "Hex".

Samantha "Sam" Destine – an artist who has the power to generate and shape a metallic ectoplasmic armor and weapons around her. The design of the armor is an unconscious expression of her artistic mind, as it reacts to her thoughts. The shape and hardness of her metal forms are varied, as she can also generate a set of wings like a hang glider. The armor's beauty and strength can make flesh seem repulsive to her, and as a result, she has grown apart from ordinary people. The armor acts as a second skin, with a sense of touch similar to her own flesh. She is the youngest of the known Destine adults. She was born in the early 1950s, and was about the twins' current age in 1963. She graduated from college in 1972, and as part of the Relative Stranger Protocol, goes by the name Samantha Hassard of Perpignan, France. Alan Davis, who describes her as "aloof, brooding [and] exotic", explained that he originally designed the character, nicknamed Argent, in 1991 for a series that he and Paul Neary tried to develop.  Davis made her armor constantly changing, in order to alleviate the tedium of drawing its detail with accurate continuity.

Rik Destine – nothing is known of Rik other than his name, and the fact that he is alive, as Kay mentions in ClanDestine (Vol. 2) #3.

Rory and Pandora Destine – whereas Adam's other children manifested their abilities in adulthood, 11-year-old twins Rory and Pandora manifested their abilities six months prior to The ClanDestine (Vol.1) #1 because as twins, their powers stimulate each other when in close proximity, and only manifest themselves as such. The exact maximum distance they can be separated and still use their powers is unknown, but they can be separated by a number of rooms and corridors and still use them.

Rory has the ability to manipulate gravity. This allows him to fly, to make objects extremely heavy, or light enough to float or throw them, to create forcefields that can protect him from bullets, and to crush small objects. He can crush a live grenade whose pin has been pulled, and keep it from harming others when it explodes. Since he is a child, the full potential of his powers is unknown. He can, for example, lift up Dominic and a transformed Walter, but during the X-Men encounter, when Walter loses control of his transformations and turns into a much larger incarnation of himself, Rory can only lift him up slightly by his feet. Rory fights crime under the superhero codename the Crimson Crusader, and loves following all the superhero clichés.

Pandora has the ability to manipulate light. She can project beams of light powerful enough to pulverize boulders or focus them to create laser beams that can instantly cut through objects. She can bend light around her and other objects in order to make them invisible. Although she joins Rory on his superhero jaunts, during which she uses the codename Imp, she is not as obsessed with being a superhero as Rory is.

Members of unknown status
Nathaniel Destine - all that is known about Nathaniel is that like Kay, Gracie and Albert, he is a practitioner of the mystic arts, but according to Albert, Nathaniel is far more adept with them than Albert himself is.

Deceased members
Thaddeus Destine - Thaddeus was the second oldest of Adam and Elalyth's known children, and their oldest known son. Thaddeus was a warrior born with the ability to adopt the aspect of any beast. He was a highly skilled fighter with great strength and speed. In the winter of 1374, he was knocked off a snow cliff in Tibet by the Inhuman, Tral, while he and Adam escorted Albert to a monastery, falling to his death. In his only appearance to date, Thaddeus' face and body were covered with striped fur, like that of a tiger, but his human appearance has not been seen.
Vincent Destine - Vincent first appeared in the form of a 1963 still photograph in issue #2 of the original series. All that was known of him until 2012 was that he destroyed the family manor, and that Adam was forced to kill him because, as Adam says, he was "evil". Vincent's first appearance in-story was in the storyline that ran in issues 11 and 12 of the first series, after Alan Davis left the title. However, when Davis returned to the characters with the X-Men and The ClanDestine miniseries in 1996, he retconned the events of those two previous issues as having never happened, establishing through Rory's dialogue that those events were a nightmare of his. Vincent's first canonical appearance was in Fantastic Four Annual #33, in which it was revealed that he had the ability to teleport himself and others across both time and space, enabling him to visit settings that included the Jurassic era, Ancient Rome and the 1969 Woodstock festival, though he did not develop the skill to select destinations until he was older. He also had the ability to shrink people down in size. As a young boy, he used his powers to summon the Thing and the Human Torch, whom he believed were elementals that he had conjured for his bidding. Traveling forward through time would cause him to apparently disappear for months and years to his family, which greatly disturbed them. By the time he was a young man, he had become inspired by a poet and philosopher named Pitor, and sought his counsel for an "insoluble dilemma", but was grief-stricken when Pitor was beaten to death by skinheads, and became suicidal over how his life had become "a knot of temporal paradox". He was also angered at his family for what he perceived as their apathy towards global suffering, characterizing them as "self-absorbed parasites". After discovering that Vincent was possessed by a demonic energy that was unleashing his destructive potential, Adam, feeling that he had failed to protect Vincent, fatally snapped his neck. Dominic holds this against Adam, but Walter and Kay support Adam's actions, arguing that it had to be done.
Florence "Flo" Destine -  Flo pretended to be Rory and Pandora's grandmother. In the introductory storyline, she is killed by Lenz's creatures. With her dying breath, she tells Walter to inform the twins of the truth about the family.
Maurice Fortuit A red-haired man, the full nature of his powers has not been revealed, but he is able to generate some type of energy around his hands. He is killed by Lenz's creatures at his mountain top chalet in the Swiss Alps near St. Moritz. Albert saw Maurice as an alive, passionate fighter, and a good man, but lamented that his temper would be the death of him.
Garth, Sherlock and Lance Destine All that is known about them are their headstones on the Destine property.
Adam's parents - their gravestones are seen in the family graveyard. Kay met them in 1209 on the family property, when it was a Saxon village.

Collected editions

In other media

The 2022 Disney+ series Ms. Marvel features a group known as the Clandestines, though this group bears no resemblance to the Destine family. In the series, they are depicted as Djinn exiled from the Noor dimension whose origin is tied to the background of series protagonist Kamala Khan and her family, in particular her great-grandmother, Aisha, and her activities during the Partition.

Notes

References

External links
ClanDestine at Marvel.com

Callahan, Timothy (June 13, 2008). "Clandestine #5". Comic Book Resources

1994 comics debuts
2008 comics debuts
Jinn in popular culture
Marvel Comics superhero teams
Characters created by Alan Davis